The 2015 Chicago Blitz season was the second season for the American Indoor Football (AIF) franchise, and their first season in the AIF.

On October 4, 2014, the Blitz announced they were joining X-League Indoor Football for the 2015 season. Shortly after, the team was removed from the X-League website, and was no longer affiliated with the X-League. On October 15, 2014, the Blitz joined American Indoor Football (AIF), following former CIFL team, the Sting. The Blitz finished the regular season 6-2, earning the 3 seed in the AIF playoffs. They defeated the 2nd seeded Saginaw Sting 63-45 in the AIF semifinals, earning a berth in the 2015 AIF Championship Game. The Blitz traveled to York, Pennsylvania to take on the York Capitals for the AIF crown. The Blitz fell to the Capitals 30-58.

Regular season

Schedule

Standings

Postseason

Roster

References

Chicago Blitz
Chicago Blitz
Chicago Blitz (indoor football)